OSAM could refer to :

 O'Shaughnessy Asset Management, LLC
 OSAM-1 (On-orbit, Servicing and Manufacturing 1), a NASA satellite
 OSAM-2 or Archinaut, a NASA project